John Kilian also ,  (March 22, 1811 – September 12, 1884) was a Lutheran pastor and leader of the colony known as the Wends of Texas.

Background

John Kilian was born in Doehlen, in the Kingdom of Saxony. After school in Rachlau and Bautzen, he studied theology at the University of Leipzig.  He was a pastor in Hochkirch (his home parish) from 1834–1837. Because of the death of his uncle he became a pastor in Kotitz. In 1848, he became a pastor in Weigersdorf, Prussia. He rejected the "growing rationalism" that was growing among the clergy, calling for a return to Scripture as authoritative, translating a number of German items into Sorbian.

Texas Colony
It was during the year 1854 that about 558 Wendish Lutherans from Kilian's congregations in Prussia and also from Saxony called him to lead them to Texas. Many people in Kilian's congregation were dissatisfied with the philosophy of rationalism spreading through Europe. Some viewed rationalism as an attempt to replace religion with science. With growing religious discontent, economic hardship and Kilian's desire to be a missionary in a foreign country, Kilian brought his followers to Galveston and eventually settled about 55 miles east of Austin in Lee County.

On March 25, 1854, a new Lutheran congregation was organized at Dauban, to become the cornerstone of a large Wendish emigration. Rev. Kilian was called as Pastor. This move resulted in the establishment of Low Pin Oak Settlement later renamed Serbin. One of the first acts accomplished by Rev. Kilian was to apply for membership in the fledgling  Lutheran Church–Missouri Synod. St. Paul's Lutheran Church in Serbin became the first of many Missouri Synod churches in Texas, and it had the only Wendish language speaking school in America.

Kilian wrote a number of hymns that have survived. He also wrote poetry and poetic speeches that are preserved

Concordia University Texas
The legacy of John Kilian is apparent at the campus of the Concordia University Texas which features Kilian Road and an over-150-year-old bell at the entrance of Building A which Kilian and his followers brought on their journey to Texas. At its old campus, the university's first building was named Kilian Hall.

Selected works
Baptismal Records Of St. Paul Lutheran Church, Serbin, Texas 1854-1883

References

Other sources
 Blasig, Anne. The Wends of Texas (The Naylor Company. San Antonio, Texas. 1957)
 Cravens, Craig and David Zersen, editors. Transcontinental Encounters: Central Europe Meets the American Heartland (Austin, TX: Concordia University Press, 2005)
 Grider, Sylvia.  The Wendish Texans (The University of Texas Institute of Texan Cultures. San Antonio, Texas. 1982)
 Malinkowa, Trudla. Shores of Hope: Wends Go Overseas (Austin: Concordia University Press, 2009)
 Nielsen, George.  In Search of Home, Nineteenth-Century Wendish Immigration (College Station: Texas A & M University Press.1989)
 Malinkowa, Trudla, ed. 2014. Jan Kilian (1811–1884). Pastor, Poet, Emigrant. Sammelband der internationalen Konferenz zum 200. Geburtstag des lutherischen Geistlichen, Bautzen, 23.–24. September 2011. Papers of the International Conference on the Occasion of the 200th Birthday of the Lutheran Minister, Bautzen, 23–24 September 2011. [each chapter in both German & English] Bautzen: Domowina Verlag.
 Wukasch, Charles. A Rock Against Alien Waves: A History of the Wends Second Edition (Austin: Concordia University Press, 2008)
 Zersen, David. An Exciting Find in a Wendish Vault in Texas. Concordia Historical Institute Quarterly. Fall 2012. 
 Zersen, David, ed. The Poetry and Music of Jan Kilian (Austin: Concordia University Press, 2011)
 Zersen, David, "An Isolated Texas Lutheran Scholar Living in Hope." Concordia Historical Institute Quarterly. Summer 2018.

External links
Concordia University Texas Official Website

1811 births
1884 deaths
People from Bautzen (district)
People from the Kingdom of Saxony
German emigrants to the United States
American people of Sorbian descent
19th-century American Lutheran clergy
People from Lee County, Texas
Lutheran Church–Missouri Synod people
19th-century German translators
19th-century German Lutheran clergy
Sorbian-language writers